Vitaly Iosifovich Margulis (April 16, 1928 – May 29, 2011) was a Soviet-Russian classical pianist.

Biography
Vitaly Margulis (also known as Vitalij Margulis) was born in the city of Kharkov in the USSR (now Kharkiv, Ukraine). He took his first piano lessons from his father, whose teacher studied with the composer Alexander Scriabin. Margulis continued studies at the Leningrad Conservatory, where from 1958 until his emigration to the west in 1974, he taught piano.  In 1975, Margulis became a full Professor at the Hochschule für Musik Freiburg, Germany. In 1994, he became Professor of Piano at the University of California in Los Angeles. In addition, he also gave piano master classes around the world.

References

External links
Vitaly Margulis website

Ukrainian pianists
1928 births
2011 deaths
Musicians from Kharkiv
Academic staff of the Hochschule für Musik Freiburg
UCLA Herb Alpert School of Music faculty
20th-century classical pianists
Jewish classical pianists
Ukrainian classical pianists
Ukrainian emigrants to Germany